Tatiane Nascimento Pacheco (born October 16, 1990) is a Brazilian basketball player for América Basquete Recife and the Brazilian national team. She began in the sport at the age 9, and six years later was already in the junior squads of the national team. Pacheco started playing for the adult team in 2013, where she won the South American Championship and a bronze medal at  Americas Championship, earning her and the Brazilian team a spot at the 2014 FIBA World Championship.

While Pacheco was listed for the 2016 Summer Olympics, the day she would debut at the women's tournament she reported an indisposure and went to the medical staff. Following examinations at the Olympic Village medical post, Pacheco was diagnosed with mumps, and had to be cut out of the roster.

References

External links
FIBA Profile

1990 births
Living people
Brazilian women's basketball players
Basketball players at the 2016 Summer Olympics
Basketball players at the 2019 Pan American Games
Olympic basketball players of Brazil
Pan American Games medalists in basketball
Shooting guards
Basketball players from São Paulo
Pan American Games gold medalists for Brazil
Medalists at the 2019 Pan American Games